Engane Nee Marakkum is a 1983 Indian Malayalam-language romantic drama film produced and directed by M. Mani and written by Priyadarshan. It stars Mohanlal, Shankar, and Menaka. The film features songs and score composed by Shyam. The story is about the love triangle between Shambhu, Prem, and Shobha.

Plot
Sambhu and Prem are friends but their friendship takes a turn when they fall for same woman Shobha. Rest of the story unwinds how their love and friendship changes.

Cast

Mohanlal as Shambhu
Shankar as Premkumar
Menaka as Shobha
Bhagyalakshmi as Devi
Sukumari
Adoor Bhasi
Sankaradi
V. D. Rajappan
Anuradha
Kunchan
Poojappura Ravi
Ramu
Santhakumari

Soundtrack

The music was composed by Shyam and the lyrics were written by Chunakkara Ramankutty. Single "Vellitheril" was sung by Vani Jairam and Krishnachandran.

Reception
The film was a commercial success at the box office. Engane Nee Marakkum is one of the early films in which Mohanlal began playing comedic roles.

References

External links
 

1983 films
Indian romantic drama films
1980s Malayalam-language films
Films directed by M. Mani
Films scored by Shyam (composer)
1983 romantic drama films